The SEAT 850 was a car launched in 1966, based upon the Fiat 850. Originally only available with the same 2-door sedan body as used in Italy, two different 4-door versions also appeared in 1967. The very rare corto (short) used the bodywork developed by Francis Lombardi for the Fiat 850 "Lucciola", while the largo (long) version used a floorpan lengthened by 15 cm and bodywork developed specifically by SEAT. The car was produced in Spain from April 1966 to 1974 and it was quite popular during that time.

At the 1971 Paris Motor Salon, the 850 Especial Lujo (Special deLuxe) was presented, only available with the 4-door largo body. Production ended in late 1974, having been replaced by the SEAT 133, essentially an 850 rebodied in the style of the 127. Sedans and the standard coupé received 843 cc four-cylinder engines with either . After Fiat 850 production ceased in Italy in 1972, the SEAT version was sold in European countries through Fiat dealers for a couple of years. These cars had a Fiat badge which had "costruzione SEAT" underneath it.

Production figures
The total production per year of SEAT 850 cars is shown in the following table :

SEAT 850 Sport

The SEAT 850 Sport model was based on the Fiat 850 Coupé and Spider versions and was also available in two variants:
 SEAT 850 Sport Spider, the convertible variant
 SEAT 850 Sport Coupé and SEAT 850 Coupé, the two model versions of the coupé variant
The Sport Coupé and Spider versions were also built in Spain, although they were never exported. They were equipped with a 51 horsepower 903 cc engine as opposed to the lower powered, 843 cc standard cars.

References

850
Rear-engined vehicles

Cars of Spain
Cars introduced in 1966